Alexandros Papadimitriou (born 18 June 1973) is a Greek hammer thrower. His personal best throw is 80.45 metres, achieved in July 2000 in Athens. This is the current Greek record.

Papadimitriou was born in Larissa and attended The University of Texas at El Paso in the U.S. He began his career in Iraklis, moving to AEK later on.

Honours

References

HellenicAthletes.com: Alexandros Papadimitriou

1973 births
Living people
Athletes from Larissa
Greek male hammer throwers
Olympic athletes of Greece
Iraklis athletes
Athletes (track and field) at the 1996 Summer Olympics
Athletes (track and field) at the 2000 Summer Olympics
Athletes (track and field) at the 2004 Summer Olympics
Athletes (track and field) at the 2008 Summer Olympics
Athletes (track and field) at the 2012 Summer Olympics
European Athletics Championships medalists
World Athletics Championships athletes for Greece
UTEP Miners men's track and field athletes
Greek expatriates in the United States
Mediterranean Games silver medalists for Greece
Mediterranean Games bronze medalists for Greece
Mediterranean Games medalists in athletics
Athletes (track and field) at the 1997 Mediterranean Games
Athletes (track and field) at the 2001 Mediterranean Games
Athletes (track and field) at the 2005 Mediterranean Games
Athletes (track and field) at the 2009 Mediterranean Games